Robert Primus (born 10 November 1990) is a Trinidadian professional footballer who plays as a defender for Aizawl in the I-League.

Club career
Primus made his senior debut for San Juan Jabloteh in the 2008 season.

Aktobe

In February 2011, Primus moved to Kazakhstan Premier League side Aktobe, signing a three-year contract.

After tearing his anterior Cruciate ligament against FC Astana on 21 September 2013 against FC Astana, Primus underwent surgery in the USA which ruled him out for the remainder of the 2013 season and the first of the 2014 season. In his first game back following the surgery and rehabilitation, Primus again injured his Cruciate ligaments against FC Kaisar on 22 June 2014, ruling him out for the remainder of the season.

Morvant Caledonia United

In February 2016, Primus returned to Trinidad and Tobago, signing a contract till the end of the 2015–16 season with Morvant Caledonia United.

Central

In summer 2016, Primus left Morvant Caledonia United and joined Central.

Slutsk

In March 2018, Primus joined Belarusian club FC Slutsk.

India
In March 2019 he signed for Indian club Minerva Punjab. In September 2019 he moved to Churchill Brothers.

In September 2020, he signed with FC Bengaluru United. He with his compatriot Daniel Carr won the 2020–21 Bangalore Super Division tournament.

Aizawl
On 22 February 2022, Primus moved to another I-League club Aizawl on a season-long deal.

He made his debut for the club, on 3 March 2022, against Mohammedan, which ended in a 2–0 defeat.

International career
Primus represented the respective youth teams of Trinidad and Tobago at the 2007 FIFA U-17 World Cup and the 2009 FIFA U-20 World Cup. He made his debut for the senior team on 18 March 2009, in a friendly game against Panama.

Career statistics

Club

International

References

External links

1990 births
Living people
Trinidad and Tobago footballers
Trinidad and Tobago international footballers
San Juan Jabloteh F.C. players
FC Aktobe players
Morvant Caledonia United players
Central F.C. players
FC Slutsk players
TT Pro League players
Kazakhstan Premier League players
Association football defenders
Trinidad and Tobago expatriate footballers
Trinidad and Tobago expatriate sportspeople in Kazakhstan
Expatriate footballers in Kazakhstan
Trinidad and Tobago expatriate sportspeople in Belarus
Expatriate footballers in Belarus
RoundGlass Punjab FC players
Trinidad and Tobago expatriate sportspeople in India
Expatriate footballers in India
FC Bengaluru United players
Aizawl FC players
Trinidad and Tobago under-20 international footballers
Trinidad and Tobago youth international footballers